Tholi Valapu is a 2001 Indian Telugu-language drama film produced by M. Nageswara Rao under the T. Krishna Memorial Films banner, directed by Muthyala Subbaiah. It stars Gopichand and Sneha, with music composed by Vandemataram Srinivas. This film was the debut of Gopichand. It didn't do so well at the box office and made Gopichand wait for a while to be a hero for his next film. The film has been dubbed into Tamil as Hari and into Hindi as Blast Barood (2009).

Plot
Prem lives with his friends in the city. His dream is to own a bike, and with some help from his rural agriculturist father, he does get it. However, on the first night itself it gets punctured, and because there is no mechanic around so late, Prem decides to park it in a nearby house for the night. The door is opened by a very pretty girl Soumya, and the smitten and dumbstruck Prem manages to explain his predicament and leaves the bike and keys. The next morning when he goes to pick up the bike, he doesn't find it, and the girl and her father completely deny any knowledge. Our man understandably gets riled and creates a ruckus, but to no avail. The story progresses and a thief is caught who admits to having burgled the house in question that night. But the father continues to stoutly deny any such happening. This obviously creates some confusion, and then the burglar reveals that he also molested the daughter. There has to be a villain somewhere - enter wicked son-in-law Kailash, who is the husband of the elder daughter. Kailash grinds the family about the police case where Soumya under pressure confesses that she is the one who got molested that night. Kailash then spreads the news about Soumya and even gets the families to call off marriage with her. Prem, however who is in love with her agrees to marry her despite allegations. After marriage, Soumya becomes pregnant and kailash poisons prem's parents mind that the child can be molesters child and prompts them to force Soumya to abort the child. With no other option, soumya gives in and almost get her child aborted but at the nick of the time, Soumya s sister comes in and she reveals to everyone that she is one molested that night, and soumya took the blame because kailash will never accept her sister if she was molested. Soumya s sister then breaks all ties with Kailash and they all live happily ever after.

Cast

Gopichand as Prem
Sneha as Soumya
P. Ravi Shankar as Kailash 
Chandra Mohan as Peddireddy Mohan Rao
Sudhakar as Sundaram
Ali as Prem's friend
Sunil as Prem's friend
L.B. Sriram as Annavaram
M.S. Narayana as Insurance Narayana
Vinod as Police Inspector
Tirupathi Prakash as Tirupathi
Gautham Raju as Servant
Kallu Chidambaram as Zoo Incharge
Sudha as Prem's mother
Madhurisen as Suguna
Tejaswini as Sandhya

Production 
A few songs were shot in New Zealand.

Soundtrack

Music composed by Vandemataram Srinivas. Music released Mayuri Audio Company.

Reception 
Ajay Bashyam of Full Hyderabad opined that the film was  "just about okay" and was for "timepass". A critic from Cine South wrote that "Tholi Valapu is an impressive show of love in a new dimension and worth, a try".

References

External links
 

2001 films
2000s Telugu-language films
Films directed by Muthyala Subbaiah
Indian romantic drama films
2001 romantic drama films